Mount Hagen Rural LLG is a local-level government (LLG) of Western Highlands Province, Papua New Guinea.

Wards
01. Kumunga
02. Kiliga
03. Kelua 2
04. Kuguma
05. Kelua 1
06. Kik
07. Tega
08. Koglamp
09. Tiling
10. Kingalrui 1
11. Korobuk
12. Biaprui
13. Keltiga
14. Gabina
15. Palim 2
16. Palim 1
17. Koge 1
18. Koge 2
19. Minimp
20. Ogelbeng
21. Anga
22. Pulgimp
23. Mulga
24. Kitiga
25. Pungaminga
26. Kogmul
27. Pits
28. Togoba No.1
29. Kagamuga
30. Kingaldui 2
31. Baisu
32. Wimbuka
33. Kilam
34. Kenta
35. Koibuga
36. Kagamuga Rural
37. Kugl
38. Waninga
39. Kuguramp
40. Togoba 2

References

Local-level governments of Western Highlands Province